Daniel Rupf may refer to:

Daniel Rupf (footballer, born 1967), Swiss football defender
Daniel Rupf (footballer, born 1986), German football midfielder